Lipsana is a genus of picture-winged flies in the family Ulidiidae.

Species
 L. insulaepaschalis

References

Ulidiidae